Drop Down and Get Me is the 11th studio album by American rock 'n' roll singer-songwriter Del Shannon. It was considered a comeback album and released in December 1981 after some delay. The album was produced by Tom Petty and included the Heartbreakers as a backing band.

Track listing

References

Del Shannon albums